Lieutenant general (Lt Gen), formerly more commonly lieutenant-general, is a senior rank in the British Army and the Royal Marines. It is the equivalent of a multinational three-star rank; some British lieutenant generals sometimes wear three-star insignia, in addition to their standard insignia, when on multinational operations.

Lieutenant general is a superior rank to major general, but subordinate to a (full) general. The rank has a NATO rank code of OF-8, equivalent to a vice-admiral in the Royal Navy and an air marshal in the Royal Air Force (RAF) and the air forces of many Commonwealth countries.

The rank insignia for both the Army and the Royal Marines is a crown over a crossed sabre and baton. Since the coronation of Queen Elizabeth II, the St Edward's Crown, commonly known as the Queen's Crown, has been depicted. Before 1953, the Tudor Crown, commonly known as the King's Crown, was used.

British Army usage
Ordinarily, lieutenant general is the rank held by the officer in command of an entire battlefield corps. The General Officer Commanding NATO's Allied Rapid Reaction Corps is a British lieutenant general. Historically, I Corps and II Corps were commanded by British lieutenant generals. Additionally, three lieutenant general appointments also exist within the extant British Army's Headquarters. They are the Commander Field Army, the Commander Home Command and the Chief of Materiel (Land) in Defence Equipment and Support (double-hatted as the Quartermaster-General to the Forces).

Royal Marines usage
Although the senior appointment in the Royal Marines, the Commandant General, has since 1996 held the lower rank of major general, prior to this date the Commandant General was a lieutenant general or full general. However, given that a few more senior positions in the British Armed Forces are open to officers from different services, Royal Marines officers can and do reach the rank of lieutenant general, being posted to Joint Forces or Ministry of Defence postings. Examples include Lieutenant-General Sir Robert Fry, Lieutenant-General Sir James Dutton and Lieutenant-General Sir David Capewell.

Royal Air Force usage
From 1 April 1918 to 31 July 1919, the Royal Air Force maintained the rank of lieutenant general. It was superseded by the rank of air marshal on the following day. Although Sir David Henderson was an RAF lieutenant general, the then RAF Chief-of-Staff Sir Hugh Trenchard never held this rank. Additionally, the retired Royal Navy admiral John de Mestre Hutchison held an honorary RAF commission in the rank of lieutenant general.

The RAF lieutenant general rank insignia was similar to the naval rank insignia for a vice-admiral, with a broad band of gold being worn on the cuff with two narrower bands above it. Unlike the naval insignia, the RAF lieutenant general insignia did not have an executive curl.

See also

British and U.S. military ranks compared
British Army Other Ranks rank insignia
British Army officer rank insignia

References 

Military ranks of the British Army
Military ranks of the Royal Marines
Former military ranks of the Royal Air Force
 United Kingdom